György Szegedi was a male Hungarian international table tennis player.

He won a bronze medal at the 1929 World Table Tennis Championships in the men's doubles with István Reti.

See also
 List of table tennis players
 List of World Table Tennis Championships medalists

References

Hungarian male table tennis players
World Table Tennis Championships medalists